Incunabula is a small press originally based in Seattle, Washington, United States, operated under the sole proprietorship of Ron Drummond. 

Between 1992 and 1996, Incunabula published three books and one broadside: They Fly at Çiron by Samuel R. Delany (July 1993); Antiquities: Seven Stories by John Crowley (October 1993); "Solutions to Everything" by Michael Ventura (10 September 1994); and Atlantis: Three Tales by Samuel R. Delany (July 1995). 

After a long hiatus, the company solicited subscription payments for a 25th anniversary edition of John Crowley's 1981 novel, Little, Big, which is finally being published, as the 40th anniversary edition, at the end of 2022.

External links
 The 25th Anniversary Edition of Little, Big

Incunabula
Publishing companies established in 1992